Wang Duan railway station is a railway station located in Huai Sai Subdistrict, Prachuap Khiri Khan City, Prachuap Khiri Khan. It is the location of the narrowest part of Thailand, at about 10 km wide.

Train services 
 Ordinary 254/255 Lang Suan-Thon Buri-Lang Suan

References 
 
 

Railway stations in Thailand